Wirksworth is a civil parish in the Derbyshire Dales district of Derbyshire, England.  The parish contains 107 listed buildings that are recorded in the National Heritage List for England. Of these, one is listed at Grade I, the highest of the three grades, nine are at Grade II*, the middle grade, and the others are at Grade II, the lowest grade.  The parish contains the market town of Wirksworth and the surrounding countryside.  Most of the listed buildings are houses and associated structures, shops, farmhouses and farm buildings.  The other listed buildings include a church and associated structures, public houses, a cotton spinning mill and associated structures, mileposts and milestones, a cemetery chapel, a railway bridge, groups of bollards, schools, a former engine house, a war memorial and a telephone kiosk.


Key

Buildings

References

Citations

Sources

 

Lists of listed buildings in Derbyshire
L